Governor's Award or Governors Awards may refer to:

Governor's Award (Albania)
Governor of South Australia's Awards
Governors Awards, an annual award ceremony hosted by the Academy of Motion Picture Arts and Sciences in the U.S.